The Treasure Hunter is a 2009 Taiwanese action film directed by Kevin Chu and starring Jay Chou and Lin Chi-ling, with Ching Siu-tung served as action director.

Plot
In the northwest desert where countless prosperous dynasties have flourished and fallen, there is a rumor that buried amongst the sand exists a tomb containing countless riches. A group of mysterious guardians have been guarding the map to the location of the treasure until a fierce rivalry erupts. A notorious international crime group, The Company, manage to hunt down the map keeper but not before he manages to pass the map to a young chivalrous man, Qiao Fei (Jay Chou).

Qiao Fei is forced to give up the map to save the life of his mentor's daughter Lan Ting (Lin Chi-ling). Teaming up with Hua Ding-bang (Chen Daoming), who is a famous archeologist, and Lan Ting they embark on a dangerous journey to recover the map and fight to protect the ancient treasure.

Cast

 Jay Chou as Qiao Fei 喬飛
 Lin Chi-ling as Lan Ting 藍婷 
 Guan Xiaotong as young Lan Ting
 Eric Tsang as Pork Rib 排骨
 Chen Daoming as Master Hua Ding-bang 華爺（華定邦）
 Baron Chen as Desert Eagle 大漠飛鷹
 Will Liu as Friday 星期五
 Miao Pu as Swords Thirteen 刀刀（刀十三郎）
 Kenneth Tsang as Tu Lao-dai

Critical response
The film was generally panned by critics.

According to Perry Lam of Muse Magazine, 'Chou plays his role with a mix of nonchalance and self-righteousness which is simply irritating. He fits perfectly into a movie that, though trying hard to be escapist entertainment, often approaches its material with utmost solemnity; anything resembling a laugh, let alone fun, is taken out.'

References

External links
The Treasure Hunter at the Hong Kong Movie Database
Hong Kong Cinemagic: Treasure Hunter

2009 films
2009 action films
2009 martial arts films
2000s adventure films
Films directed by Kevin Chu
Funimation
2000s Mandarin-language films
Taiwanese action films
Taiwanese martial arts films